Wind Breaker (stylized in all caps) is a Japanese manga series written and illustrated by Satoru Nii. It began serialization on Kodansha's Magazine Pocket manga website in January 2021. As of January 2023, the series' individual chapters have been collected into ten volumes.

Publication
Written and illustrated by Satoru Nii, the series began serialization in Kodansha's Magazine Pocket website on January 13, 2021. As of January 2023, the series' individual chapters have been collected into ten tankōbon volumes.

In March 2022, Kodansha USA announced that they licensed the series for digital English publication. During their Anime NYC 2022 panel, Kodansha USA announced that they will begin releasing print copies in Fall 2023.

Volume list

Reception
The series ranked 20th at the 2021 Next Manga Award in the web manga category. At AnimeJapan 2022, the series ranked ninth in a poll asking what manga people want to see animated.

As of March 2022, the series has sold over 1.22 million copies between its digital and print versions.

References

External links
  
 

Adventure anime and manga
Japanese webcomics
Kodansha manga
Martial arts anime and manga
Shōnen manga
Webcomics in print
Yankī anime and manga